Général Alibée Féry (28 May 1818 - 1896) was a Haitian playwright, poet, and storyteller. Born in Jérémie, Féry was largely self-taught. He was the first person to tell stories of Uncle Bouqui and Ti Malice, characters who appear frequently in Haitian folklore.

Selected works 

 Essais Littéraires (play)
 Fils du Chasseur (story)
 Les Bluettes (poems)
 Les Echantillons (stories)
 Les Esquisses (historical stories)

References
 

1818 births
1896 deaths
Folklorists
Haitian male poets
19th-century Haitian poets
19th-century Haitian dramatists and playwrights
Male dramatists and playwrights
19th-century male writers